The Elmo Serejo Farias Stadium, popularly known as Serejão or, more recently, Boca do Jacaré, is a Brazilian football stadium, located at administrative region of Taguatinga, in the Distrito Federal.

The stadium holds 35,000 people. It was built in 1978. The stadium is owned by the Taguatinga Regional Administration and by the Distrito Federal Government and is the home stadium of Taguatinga Esporte Clube.

Stadium name

Its formal name honors Elmo Serejo Farias, who was Taguatinga's administrator and Distrito Federal's governor during the stadium construction.

The nickname Estádio Boca do Jacaré means Alligator's Mouth Stadium, and is a reference to Brasiliense Futebol Clube's nickname.

Serejão means Big Serejo.

History

The inaugural match was played on January 23, 1978, when Taguatinga beat Vila Nova 1-0. The first goal of the stadium was scored by Taguatinga's Dinate.

The stadium's attendance record currently stands at 26,205 people, set on October 5, 2005 when Flamengo beat Brasiliense 3-2.

In 2001, the stadium was reformed, and its maximum capacity was expanded from 22,000 people to 32,000 people.

References

Enciclopédia do Futebol Brasileiro, Volume 2 - Lance, Rio de Janeiro: Aretê Editorial S/A, 2001.

External links
Templos do Futebol
Brasiliense's Official Website

Football venues in Federal District (Brazil)
Sports venues in Federal District (Brazil)